Josef Marek (born 11 June 1987) is a professional Czech football player who plays for FC Oberlausitz Neugersdorf.

Career
Marek came to Bohemians for a trial while playing for third division side Kunice in January 2011. He went on to make three appearances for the club in the 2010–11 Gambrinus liga that season. Marek joined Dukla Prague on loan during the winter break of the 2011–12 season, before later signing a permanent contract.

References

External links
 

Czech footballers
Czech First League players
1987 births
Living people
Bohemians 1905 players
FK Dukla Prague players
FK Viktoria Žižkov players

Association football forwards
FK Kunice players
FC Oberlausitz Neugersdorf players